I Hate Hollywood is a Canadian television series, which premiered on CHCH-TV and in syndication in May 2012. Hosted by Ed the Sock and Liana Kerzner and featuring co-writer Ron Sparks, the series is a satire of entertainment news shows such as Entertainment Tonight. The series was originally slated to premiere in 2010, but was delayed by financial difficulties.

References

2012 Canadian television series debuts
Ed the Sock
First-run syndicated television shows in Canada
2010s Canadian comedy television series
Canadian television shows featuring puppetry